Corpet-Louvet was a steam locomotive manufacturer based in Paris, France.

History
Founded in 1855 as Anjubault, based in the Avenue Phillippe-Auguste in Paris, the firm was taken over by Lucien Corpet in 1868. Corpet's daughter Marguerite married Lucien Louvet, the engineer of the Compagnie Meusienne des Chemins de Fer, which used Corpet locomotives. Corpet died in 1889, and the management of the firm was taken over by Louvet. In 1912, the firm moved to new premises at La Corneuve, and a limited liability company, Corpet, Louvet et Compagnie was formed. The last steam locomotive was built in 1953, but the company is still in business, manufacturing "Caterpillar" earth moving equipment under licence.

Locomotives

The locomotives built by Corpet-Louvet had four different names on the worksplates.

Anjubault
Works numbers 1 to 121 carried Anjubault worksplates. The first three locomotives were built for the Compagnie d'Orsay and were named L'Yvette, L'Orge and Le Florian. They were all standard gauge. Almost all Anjubault locomotives were four coupled locomotives, but works number 4 bis (a duplicate works number) was a six coupled locomotive built for the Compagnie Est-Landon in 1858. The majority of Anjubault locomotives were sold to contractors building new railway lines in France. A few locomotives are known to have been sold to India, Russia, Spain and Switzerland.

L Corpet
Works numbers 122 to 565 carried L Corpet worksplates. In the 1870s and 1880s, Lucien Corpet continued to build four-coupled locomotives and also started to build six-coupled locomotives, including some designed to be able to be regauged. This design was introduced in 1880.  The first metre gauge locomotives built for light railways were works numbers 314 and 315 built for the Chemin de Fer de Cambrésis in 1880 and 1881. Corpet introduced Brown valve gear on some of his locomotives in 1881. This system was popular with Swiss Locomotive Works at Winterthur, Switzerland. Works numbers 341-44 were the first Corpet locomotives with Brown valve gear.

Vve L Corpet & L Louvet

Works numbers 566 to 1415 carried Vve L Corpet & L Louvet works plates. At the end of the 1880s and into the 1890s many light railways were built in France, many of them to metre gauge. Metre gauge six-coupled tank locomotives formed the bulk of Corpet-Louvet's production until the outbreak of the First World War. In the Ardennes, light railways were built to  gauge. Corpet-Louvet supplied fourteen locomotives between 1895 and 1906. The line and locomotives were later converted to metre gauge. Corpet-Louvet also built Mallet locomotives, the first being 0-4-4-0s built in 1897 for the Tramways à Vapeur d'Ille et Vilaine. Works numbers 1409 - 13 were 0-6-6-0 Mallets built for the Chemin de Fer du Centre. These were the largest metre gauge locomotives built by Corpet-Louvet.

Corpet, Louvet & Compagnie

Works numbers 1416 to 1962 carried Corpet, Louvet & Compagnie worksplates. Production was severely hit by the First World War, with only three locomotives being outshopped in 1915 and none in 1916. During the 1920s, production was mainly metre gauge six-coupled tank engines. During the  early 1930s, production was mainly  0-8-0-ST and 2-10-2ST locomotives. The Depression hit the firm hard, with only two locomotives being delivered in 1934, 1935, 1936 and 1938. No new locomotives were delivered in 1937 or 1939. During the Second World War, Locomotives under construction when Paris was overrun were completed, but some of these could not be delivered to their intended customers, and saw service in France. The largest locomotives built by Corpet-Louvet were ten 2-10-2T locomotives built for SNCF in 1940-42. These weighed 91 tonnes. Six standard gauge 0-8-0ST locomotives were built for Krupp in 1944. It is thought these locomotives carried Krupp works plates. The first locomotive delivered after the liberation of Paris in August 1944 was works number 1875, a standard gauge 0-8-0T of similar design to those built for Krupp. The last locomotive built for a French light railway was works number 1926 built for the Chemin de Fer de Cambrésis in 1948. The last locomotive, works number 1962 was ordered by the Houillères du Bassin d'Auvergne but subsequently cancelled. However, a locomotive carrying works number 1962 was recorded in service with the company in 1955!

Preserved Corpet-Louvet locomotives

References

8. Stefan Hooß, Corpet,Louvet et Cie, Edition Shéhérazade Karlsruhe 2018

External links
 Preserved locomotives

French companies established in 1855
Manufacturing companies based in Paris
Defunct locomotive manufacturers of France